Hungarian State Railways is the Hungarian national railway company, with divisions "MÁV START Zrt." (passenger transport), "MÁV-Gépészet Zrt." (maintenance), "MÁV-Trakció Zrt." and "MÁV Cargo Zrt" (freight transport). The head office is in Budapest.

History

1846–1918

Construction of Hungary's first railway line began in the second half of 1844. The first steam locomotive railway line was opened on 15 July 1846 between Pest and Vác. This date is regarded as the birth date of the Hungarian railways. The Romantic poet Sándor Petőfi rode on the first train and wrote a poem predicting that rails would connect Hungary like blood vessels in the human body.

After the failed revolution, the existing lines were nationalized by the Austrian State and new lines were built. As a result of the Austro-Sardinian War in the late 1850s, all these lines were sold to Austrian private companies. During this time the company of Ábrahám Ganz invented a method of "crust-casting" to produce cheap yet sturdy iron railway wheels, which greatly contributed to railway development in Central Europe.

Following the Austro-Hungarian Compromise of 1867 that created the Dual Monarchy of Austria-Hungary, transport issues became the responsibility of the Hungarian Government, which also inherited the duty to support local railway companies. This came at a considerable cost: in 1874 8% of the annual budget went to railway company subsidies. This led the Hungarian Parliament to consider founding a State Railway.  The goal was to take over and operate the Hungarian main lines. The branch lines were constructed by private companies. When the law in 1884 provided a simplified way to create railway companies many small branch line companies were founded. These, however, usually only constructed the lines, then made a contract with MÁV to operate them. Thus they also owned no locomotives or other rolling stock. MÁV made a contract only if the line, its equipment and buildings were constructed to MÁV standards. This helped to build standard station buildings, sheds, and accessories, all to the MÁV rules.

Because of relatively high prices the traffic density was considerably lower in Hungary than in other countries. To change this the Interior Minister, Gábor Baross, introduced the zone tariff system in 1889. This system resulted in lower prices for passenger trips and goods transport but it induced a rapid increase in both and so higher overall profits. In 1891 the Hungarian lines of the StEG were bought by the Hungarian State directly from the French owners and became MÁV lines.

In 1890 most large private railway companies were nationalized as a consequence of their poor management, except the strong Austrian-owned Kaschau-Oderberg Railway (KsOd) and the Austrian-Hungarian Southern Railway (SB/DV). They also joined the zone tariff system, and remained successful until the end of World War I when Austria-Hungary collapsed.

By 1910 MÁV had become one of the largest European railway companies, in terms of both its network and its finances. Its profitability, however, always lagged most Western European companies, be they publicly or privately owned. The Hungarian railway infrastructure was largely completed in these years, with a topology centred on Budapest that still remains.

By 1910, the total length of the rail networks of the Hungarian Kingdom reached , the Hungarian network linked more than 1,490 settlements. Nearly half (52%) of the Austro-Hungarian Empire's railways were built in Hungary, thus the railroad density there became higher than that of Cisleithania. This has ranked Hungarian railways the 6th most dense in the world (ahead of countries as Germany or France).

In 1911 a new locomotive numbering system was introduced which was used until the beginning of the 21st century and is still in use for motive power purchased before then. The notation specifies the number of driven axles and the maximum axle load of the locomotive.

The Hungarian Locomotive (engines and wagons bridge and iron structures) factories
Despite the Hungarian factories were independent companies, the largest suppliers of MÁV were the MÁVAG company in Budapest (steam engines and wagons) and the Ganz company in Budapest (steam engines, wagons, the production of electric locomotives and electric trams started from 1894). and the RÁBA Company in Győr.

The Ganz Works identified the significance of induction motors and synchronous motors commissioned Kálmán Kandó (1869–1931) to develop it. In 1894, Kálmán Kandó developed high-voltage three-phase AC motors and generators for electric locomotives. The first-ever electric rail vehicle manufactured by Ganz Works was a 6 HP pit locomotive with direct current traction system. The Ganz Works won the tender of electrification of railway of Valtellina Railways in Italy in 1897. Italian railways were the first in the world to introduce electric traction for the entire length of a main line, rather than just a short stretch. The  Valtellina line was opened on 4 September 1902, designed by Kandó and a team from the Ganz works. The electrical system was three-phase at 3 kV 15 Hz. The voltage was significantly higher than used earlier, and it required new designs for electric motors and switching devices. In 1918, Kandó invented and developed the rotary phase converter, enabling electric locomotives to use three-phase motors whilst supplied via a single overhead wire, carrying the simple industrial frequency (50 Hz) single phase AC of the high voltage national networks.

1918–1939
The number of freight cars was 102,000 at the end of World War I, but after 1921 only 27,000 remained in Hungary, of which 13,000 were in working order. The total number of locomotives was 4,982 in 1919, but after the peace treaty, only 1,666 remained in Hungary. As many existing railway lines crossed Hungary's new borders, most of these branch lines were abandoned. On the main lines, new border stations had to be constructed with customs facilities and locomotive service.

Between the world wars, development focused on existing multiple-track lines and adding a second track to most main lines. An electrification process started, based on Kálmán Kandó's patent on a single-phase 16 kV 50 Hz AC traction and his newly designed MÁV Class V40 locomotive, which used a rotary phase converter unit to transform the catenary high voltage current into multiphase current with regulated low voltage that fed the single multi-phase AC induction traction motor. Most main lines' cargo and passenger trains were hauled by the MÁV Class 424 steam locomotive, which became the MÁV's workhorse in the late steam era. From 1928 onwards 4- and 6-wheeled gasoline (and later diesel) railcars were purchased (Class BCmot) and by 1935 57% of branch lines were served by railcars. The rest of MÁV's passenger network remained steam based with slow pre-war locomotives and 3rd class "wooden bench" carriages (called  in Hungarian, a name nowadays applied to low cost airlines).

In the early 1930s, almost all Hungarian branch line operators went bankrupt because of the Great Depression. DSA, the Hungarian successor to the former Austrian-Hungarian Southern Railway, went into receivership. MÁV took over DSA's branch lines and all property in 1932 and continued to operate them. MÁV thus became the only major railway operator in Hungary, the impact of the few other independent railway companies (GySEV, AEGV) being negligible.

1939–1950

During late World War II the Hungarian railway system suffered tremendous destruction. More than half the main lines and a quarter of the branch lines were inoperable. 85% of all bridges were destroyed, 28% of all buildings were ruined and another 32% of them inoperable. The rolling stock was either destroyed or distributed to many other European countries. Only 213 locomotives, 120 railcars (there was no fuel in the last days of the war to move them away), 150 passenger cars and 1,900 freight cars were in working order. These were prized and signed as "trophies" by the Soviet Red Army.

After World War II the track, buildings and service equipment were repaired with tremendous efforts in relatively short time. By 1948 most of the railway system was operable, some larger bridges needing more time to be rebuilt. The first electrified section was already in use by October 1945. The Red Army sold back the confiscated rolling stock and locomotives were returned from Austria and Germany. To accelerate reconstruction MÁV purchased 510 USATC S160 Class locomotives which became MAV Class 411.

1950–2000

In the 1950s, an accelerated industrialization was ordered by the Hungarian Socialist Workers' Party and the railway was considered a backbone of these efforts. Overloaded trains were hauled by badly maintained locomotives on poor quality tracks. Unrealistic Five Year Plans were specified; not fulfilling them was considered sabotage. After accidents, railway workers were given show trials and sometimes even sentenced to death.

All the time the production of steam locomotives continued, but at first in small numbers, as the Hungarian industry was fully booked producing Soviet war reparations. This included steam locomotives to Soviet designs, passenger and freight cars, and many other goods. The development of diesel locomotives started. The successor of the Kandó V40 locomotives, the Class V55 proved to be a failure and MÁV decided to purchase no more phase converter engines.

During the 1956 Hungarian Revolution the railways were not seriously damaged. After the suppressed Revolution the system of Five-Year Plans was reintroduced but with lower targets. In 1958 steam locomotive manufacturing stopped in Hungary. 600 HP diesel-electric locomotives (Class M44) and 450 HP diesel hydraulic switchers (Class M31) were manufactured.

By 1964, the German-designed, domestically-built MÁV Class V43 four-axle 25 kV AC 50 Hz electric locomotive entered service and eventually some 450 of this reliable engine became the workhorse of MÁV traction in passenger as well as freight service. Heavy diesel engines arrived from the USSR (M62) and Sweden/United States (M61). Track maintenance, however, always remained poor, preventing the rolling stock from using the system to its fullest.

To this day  (particularly ) remains the top speed for trains in Hungary, though EU funds have become available to upgrade the network, especially tracks of the Trans-European Transport Networks. (Since Hungary lies in Central Europe, many important railway lines go through the country.) During the 1990s the state-owned MÁV gradually abandoned its most rural routes, but large scale passenger service cuts were blocked by political pressure. Still, the quality of general passenger service deteriorated considerably since Hungary converted to capitalism, as MÁV became focused on the more profitable cargo business. Relatively few people have access to the higher-quality "Intercity" express trains because of the unbalanced topography of the Hungarian railway network. Further expansion is also hampered by the shortage of high-quality passenger carriages.

2000–2010

As the post-2000 Hungarian political establishment became very much focused on the perceived "autobahn-gap" compared to better-routed Slovakia and especially Croatia and decided to upgrade the highway system, there was no significant domestic funding for developing the Hungarian Railway especially for the small regional lines. Recent developments include the purchase of twelve Siemens Desiro diesel railbuses for commuter routes and the order for Swiss Stadler Flirts, a type of very advanced electric self-propelled train for medium range shuttle paths, which is mired in a selection scandal against Bombardier's more established, but conservatively engineered Talent trains.

The GySEV Győr–Sopron–Ebenfurti Vasút Rt. line (connecting two Hungarian and one Austrian city) is managed jointly by the two states.

In 2006 the government was elected for promises, among those are making the lines between cities double-tracked, electrified, and validated for 160 km/h (by this transferring highway-cargo of companies to more environment-friendly, faster and greater capacity transportation). This was supposed to be done by first building the new track then building the remaining one in the place of the original one. The only possible way to finance the project was with the help of EU funds. EU supervision revised the plans and the projected cost but this delayed starting. During construction, the actual billings were also checked. Because of the delay and the lengthy construction works, most of the lines are still not opened in the planned state. The building works are largely forgotten by public consciousness because of the following:

The government, referring to an obligation under the constitution, ensured access to public transit in all settlements by installing bus routes and buses from Volánbusz Mass-Transit Company. This in cases when single railway stations served multiple villages, meant bus stations were established in the centers or ends of each settlement. This and increasing frequency theoretically can be done while eliminating the high fuel (diesel or electricity) consumption of the trains and their maintenance cost.

The first plans of János Kóka, Minister of the Economy and Transport, were more radical, abandoning 26 lines (or 12% of the entire network), but they were met with strong opposition from the local municipalities, parliamentary opposition parties and civic organizations. The main opposition party claimed that these measures were directed against more rural areas, especially small villages. The issue was heavily politicized. People considered the buses less safe or fast, especially in winter. Since the government wanted to avoid costly environmental protection and recultivation regulations, the railway lines will not be formally ceased, with the tracks removed, just the service suspended indefinitely. However, because of widespread scrap metal theft in Hungary, this effectively means the tracks are written off.

On 4 March 2007 service was suspended on 14 lines: Pápa–Környe, Pápa–Csorna, Zalabér–Zalaszentgrót, Lepsény–Hajmáskér, Sellye–Villány, Diósjenő–Romhány, Kisterenye–Kál–Kápolna, Mezőcsát–Nyékládháza, Kazincbarcika–Rudabánya, Nyíradony–Nagykálló, Békés–Murony, Kunszentmiklós–Dunapataj, Fülöpszállás–Kecskemét and Kiskőrös–Kalocsa. Many of these have since been reopened by the new government.

On 20 April 2007, the Index news web portal published material from internal MÁV studies, which indicated the new company leadership and the government intend to close all small regional railway lines after 2008, to eliminate sources of reincurring unfinanced expenses at MÁV (the to-be-closed lines' expenses are ten times as large as their incomes). This would leave only the international railway lines and large rural-to-town routes running.

However, in 2010, when Fidesz returned to power, the new government announced that they would undo a plethora of transportation decisions made by the socialists. Ten rural railway lines, previously closed with the reason of low revenues, were reopened with much fanfare. The government states both bus and railway system have to be developed, and most settlements shouldn't be limited to have only one type of station.

2013
In February 2013, for the first time in its history, the railway started to train women drivers. The Times quoted a spokesman as saying that since there are no steam trains, there is no need for heavy lifting.

Stadler KISS 

MÁV-Start entered into a framework contract with Stadler in 2017 for the purchase of a maximum of 40, 6-train unit motor trains, of which 11 will be the first installments. The wagon body and bogie of the motor trains is assembled in Szolnok, the non-driven middle wagon section and the final assembly of the trains take place at the Dunakeszi Vehicle Repair, so the domestic production rate of the trains will be more than 50%. In 2018, MÁV-Start called for an additional 8 motor trains, and in 2019, preparations for drawing up the remaining 21 began. Trains will run on the Budapest-Cegléd-Szolnok and Budapest-Szob railway lines from 2020, both of which are the busiest in the country.

On 16 July 2019, the first motor train, numbered 815,001, was publicly displayed.

All trains are expected to operate on the Budapest suburban lines by 2021.

Railway stations

Many of the railway's major stations (and also numerous major stations within the Austro-Hungarian Empire now located outside Hungary) were designed by Ferenc Pfaff and opened in the late 1880s and 1890s.

Budapest
 Déli Railway Station (South)
 Keleti Railway Station (East, Central)
 Nyugati Railway Station (West)
 Kelenföld Railway Station
Köbánya-Kispest Railway Station

Miskolc
 Miskolc-Tiszai Railway Station
 Miskolc-Gömöri Railway Station

Pécs
Pécs Railway Station

Debrecen 

 Debrecen Railway Station (Nagyállomás)
 Debrecen-Csapókert Station

Szeged 

 Szeged Railway Station 
Szeged-Rókus Station

Győr 

 Győr Railway Station

Nyíregyháza 

 Nyíregyháza Railway Station
 Nyíregyháza-Külsö Station

Statistics

 Railway lines total: 
 Standard gauge: 
 Broad gauge:  of 
 Narrow gauge: 

Note: The standard and broad gauge railways are operated by the State Railways and also the following narrow gauge railways: Nyíregyháza–Balsai Tisza part/Dombrád; Balatonfenyves–Somogyszentpál; Kecskemét–Kiskunmajsa/Kiskőrös and the Children's Railway in Budapest. All the other narrow gauge railways are run by State Forest companies or local non-profit organisations. See also Narrow gauge railways in Hungary.

See also
 Rail transport in Hungary
 Transport in Hungary
 List of railway lines in Hungary
 Imperial Royal Austrian State Railways
 BHÉV

References

External links

 Official site of MÁV
 Official site of MÁV-Start (passenger trains operator)
 Rail Cargo Hungary (ex-MÁV, Rail Cargo Austria Group)
 Railway map -  with junctions and track types
 Railway map - with all stations, Hungarian-German description
 Photographs of railway stations
 Railways and Tourism, Public Transport in Hungary
 Railway photos arranged on a map at benbe.hu
 Budapest public transport map

Public transport companies in Hungary
Railway companies of Hungary
Government-owned companies of Hungary
Companies based in Budapest
Hungarian brands
1868 establishments in Austria-Hungary
Government-owned railway companies